Charles Cheatham Cavanah (September 26, 1871 – June 30, 1953) was a United States district judge of the United States District Court for the District of Idaho.

Education and career

Cavanah was born on September 26, 1871 in Greensboro, North Carolina, to parents Frank and Larue (Cheatham) Cavanah. Frank Cavanah traveled to Idaho Territory that year to pursue mining interests in Rocky Bar and Hailey, and he remained in Idaho until his death in 1897. Larue Cavanah died in 1872, leaving the infant Charles in the care of family members. Cavanah attended public schools in North Carolina and in Texas, where he also worked as a store clerk. In 1892, he moved to Boise, Idaho and became court crier of the Idaho Supreme Court. Cavanah read law in the office of William Borah, and he lived at the home of Judge Joseph W. Houston. After admission to the bar in 1895, Cavanah joined the partnership of Borah, Cavanah & Blake. Later, Cavanah became senior partner in Cavanah, Blake & McLane. In 1897, Cavanah was elected Boise city attorney, and in 1906 he was elected to represent Ada County, Idaho in the Idaho State Legislature.

Federal judicial service

Cavanah was nominated by President Calvin Coolidge on December 22, 1926, to a seat on the United States District Court for the District of Idaho vacated by Judge Frank Sigel Dietrich. He was confirmed by the United States Senate on January 3, 1927, and received his commission the same day. He assumed senior status on January 3, 1942. His service terminated on June 30, 1953, due to his death in Boise. Cavanah and his wife, Mildred Benzel Cavanah (1877–1927), are interred at Morris Hill Cemetery in Boise.

See also
 C. C. Cavanah House

References

External links
 
 

1871 births
1953 deaths
Judges of the United States District Court for the District of Idaho
United States district court judges appointed by Calvin Coolidge
20th-century American judges